Nagarain is a municipality in Dhanusha District in Province No. 2 of south-eastern Nepal. As of 2011 Nepal census, it has a population of 36,336 living in 6,478 individual households. It was formed by joining Fulgama, Devdiha, old Nagrain, Lagmagadha Guthi and Ghodghans village development committees. The total area of Nagarain municipality is 38.71 km2.

Education

Nagarain is facilitated by Shree Rajeshwor Nidhi Higher Secondary School, which is run by government. It attracts students from Nagarain as well as the neighbouring villages. Recently, the infrastructure of this school was upgraded and a new classroom block was constructed with the aid from Government of India. Therefore, this building is named "Nepal-Bharat Maitri Bhawan". There are few private schools (run by individuals) which provide education in English medium.

Notable people from Nagarain 
 Rajeshwor Nidhi
 Mahendra Narayan Nidhi
 Bimalendra Nidhi
 Durgananda Jha
 Smriti Narayan Chaudhary

References

External links
Map of Dhanusha district with updated sub-metropolitan city and municipalities - LGCDP, Ministry of Federal Affairs and Local Development, Government of Nepal
गाविसहरुको बस्ती विवरण, District Development Committee, Dhanusha

Populated places in Dhanusha District
Nepal municipalities established in 2017
Municipalities in Madhesh Province